Tverdokhlebovka is a rural locality (a selo) and the administrative center of Tverdokhlebovskoye Rural Settlement, Bogucharsky District, Voronezh Oblast, Russia. The population was 726 as of 2010. There are 9 streets.

Geography 
Tverdokhlebovka is located on the left bank of the Bogucharka River, 23 km west of Boguchar (the district's administrative centre) by road. Lugovoye is the nearest rural locality.

References 

Rural localities in Bogucharsky District